Hope Cemetery is an historic rural cemetery at 119 Webster Street in Worcester, Massachusetts.  Established in 1854, it was the city's sixth public cemetery, and is the burial site of remains originally interred at its first five cemeteries.  Its landscaping and funerary art are examplars of the rural cemetery movement, and the cemetery was listed on the National Register of Historic Places in 1997. The cemetery occupies .

Description and history
Hope Cemetery is located in far southern Worcester, atop a rise known as Webster Hill, which has commanding views to the north and east, including the campuses of Clark University and Holy Cross College.  The cemetery was laid out, probably by a landscape designer (although none has been identified), in the rural cemetery style, with winding lanes that take advantage of the terrain.  It also includes horticultural plantings of note, another hallmark of the rural cemetery style, including several distinguished specimens of beech, Norway maple, sugar maple, cedar, ash, and oak trees.

Worcester's first burying ground was located at Thomas and Summer Streets, and was established in 1713, and had seventeen graves marked by stone mounds, and the second burying ground, located on the Worcester Common, had more than 100 burials, all of which were relocated here in the 20th century.  The third burying ground, Raccoon Plain, was a small cemetery with sixteen burials, all of which were reinterred here in 1857.  The fourth burying ground, at Mechanic Street, had more than 1000 burials, which were moved here in 1878–79.  The Pine Meadow Burying Ground's 658 interments were relocated here between 1862 and 1878.

Notable interments
 Agnes Ballard, architect, educator, one of the first women elected to office in Florida
 Elizabeth Bishop, poet
 Loring Coes, inventor of the Monkey wrench
 Abby Kelley Foster, 19th century social reformer and feminist
 Stephen Symonds Foster, radical abolitionist 
 Robert Goddard, engineer, inventor of the first liquid-fueled rocket
 John Bartholomew Gough, temperance lecturer
 Iver Johnson, firearm, bicycle and motorcycle manufacturer
 Charles H. Pinkham, Medal of Honor recipient
 Thomas Plunkett, Medal of Honor recipient
 Capt. Peter Slater, youngest participant in the Boston Tea Party, fought in the American Revolution
 Amy Tanner, psychologist at Clark University
 Eli Thayer, Congressman
 Webster Thayer, trial judge in the Sacco and Vanzetti case

See also
National Register of Historic Places listings in southwestern Worcester, Massachusetts
National Register of Historic Places listings in Worcester County, Massachusetts
 Rural Cemetery (Worcester, Massachusetts), a private rural cemetery

References

Cemeteries in Worcester, Massachusetts
Cemeteries on the National Register of Historic Places in Massachusetts
1854 establishments in Massachusetts
National Register of Historic Places in Worcester, Massachusetts
Rural cemeteries